Louis John DiBella Jr. (born May 17, 1960) is an American boxing promoter and television/film producer.

Education 
DiBella is a graduate of Regis High School (New York City). He then continued his education at Tufts University before pursuing a Juris Doctor degree at Harvard Law School.

Career

Boxing promotion 
DiBella currently promotes the fighters Regis Prograis, Tevin Farmer, Sergiy Derevyanchenko, Ivan Baranchyk, Richard Commey, George Kambosos Jr., as well as prospects Oleksandr Teslenko and US Olympian Charles Conwell, among others. DiBella is an ardent supporter of women's boxing and his expanding roster of female fighters includes world champions Amanda Serrano and Alicia Napoleon as well as Heather Hardy, Shelly Vincent, Raquel Miller and Tiara Brown. He also promoted events that Deontay Wilder, the former WBC heavyweight champion, fights on.

Past boxers represented by DiBella Entertainment include former WBC Middleweight champion Sergio Martínez, former middleweight world champions Jermain Taylor and Bernard Hopkins, former junior welterweight titlist Paulie Malignaggi, former WBC welterweight champion Andre Berto and "Jo Jo" Dan.

Producer 
DiBella expanded his boxing empire producing television content and films. In 2007, he produced the documentary Magic Man, which depicted the life of Paulie Malignaggi and his rise in the world of boxing. The documentary had its television premiere on Showtime and was later aired in the United Kingdom leading up to the Malignaggi vs. Lovemore Ndou fight, where Malignaggi retained his title.

In 2008, DiBella added the credit of executive producer to his list of accomplishments with the 2009 film Love Ranch starring Helen Mirren and Joe Pesci. The film was directed by Taylor Hackford.

DiBella was also the associate producer on the film The Fighter, which was released in 2010 and based on the life of former DBE fighter "Irish" Micky Ward, starring Mark Wahlberg as Ward and Christian Bale as his trainer and brother Dickie Ecklund. The film won two Academy Awards for Best Supporting Actor and Best Supporting Actress.

DiBella then established the television and film production company BK Blu. In its first year, the company premiered the film Tapia at the LA Film Festival then later, premiered the documentary Maravilla at the Tribeca Film Festival, premiered the documentary Hardy at the DOC NYC Film Festival, and acquired the rights to a number of television and film projects currently in development. The Tapia documentary, which was co-executive produced by DiBella and Curtis "50 Cent" Jackson, premiered on HBO in December 2014.

Other ventures
As of May 5, 2017, DiBella also owns the Tampa Bay Rays Baseball AA Southern League affiliate, the Montgomery Biscuits. The Biscuits' home field is Montgomery Riverwalk Stadium.

References

External links 

 DiBella Entertainment
 

1960 births
Living people
American people of Italian descent
Tufts University alumni
Harvard Law School alumni
Baseball executives
American boxing promoters
People from Brooklyn
Regis High School (New York City) alumni
American chief executives